The 2017–18 Angolan Basketball League, for sponsorships named the 2017–18 Unitel Basket, was the 40th edition of the Angolan Basketball League. The season ended on 6 June, when Primeiro de Agosto won its 19th championship.

Regular season

Playoffs

References 

Angolan_Basketball_League, 2017-18
Angolan Basketball League seasons